The 1954 European Judo Championships were the 4th edition of the European Judo Championships, and were held in Brussels, Belgium, from 10 to 11 December 1954.

Medal winners

References 

European Judo Championships
European Judo Championships
European Judo Championships
Judo competitions in Belgium
Sport in Brussels
International sports competitions hosted by Belgium
E